Babe Bagby, also listed as Bagley, was a professional baseball catcher in the Negro leagues. He played with the Cincinnati Tigers in 1937.

References

External links
 and Seamheads 

Cincinnati Tigers (baseball) players
Year of birth missing
Year of death missing
Baseball catchers